Toon Time is an Australian television entertainment programme 111 Hits created and executive produced by Darren Chau, and hosted by Penelope Mitchell and Dickie Knee (John Blackman) from Hey Hey It's Saturday fame. The programme features Bugs Bunny and the popular Warner Brothers animated characters, plus comedy segments, competitions and specials guests. Toon Time premiered on 18 July 2011 at 5.30pm.

Penelope Mitchell hosted the program. The programme is the highest rating local production on Channel 111HITS, and its promotional campaign won 5 Gold Promax Awards.

Special guests
 Molly Meldrum
 George Kapiniaris
 Simon Palomares
 Tim Ellis
 Anthony Harkin (Rock of Ages)
 Brent Hill (Rock of Ages)
 Brad Johnson (AFL footballer)
 David Cotter
 Aeriel Manx
 Andrew Welsh (AFL footballer)
 Cameron Tragardh (NBL basketballer)
 Frank Lotito

References

External links
 

111 (Australian TV channel) original programming
2011 Australian television series debuts
2012 Australian television series endings
English-language television shows